Hira, or Heera, is a South Asian given name. The Sanskrit word  has several meanings, one of which is "diamond".

Given name
Hira Chandra KC
Hira Devi Waiba
Hira Gurung
Hira Lal
Hira Lal Atal
Hira Lal Devpura
Hira Lall Sibal
Hira Mani
Hira Singh Bisht
Hira Singh Dard
Hira Singh Gabria
Hira Singh Khatri
Hira Singh Nabha
Hira Solanki
Hira Tareen
Hira Te Popo
Hira Vallabh Tripathi
Heera Pathak, Gujarati poet and literary critic
Heera Rajagopal, Indian actress
Heera Saraniya, Indian politician
Heera Singh Sandhu, 18th-century Sikh leader

See also
Heer (disambiguation)
Heera (disambiguation)
Hera (disambiguation)

References

Bangladeshi feminine given names
Given names
Indian feminine given names
Pakistani feminine given names